Thomas Henry Ball (January 14, 1859 – May 7, 1944) was a Texas politician and a Democratic member of the United States House of Representatives. He was mayor of Huntsville, Texas, from 1877 to 1892, and moved to Houston in 1902.

Thomas Henry Ball and Frank Andrews formed a law firm in Houston in 1902.  Melvin Kurth joined in 1913. Andrews Kurth was important to Texas railroad firms early in the twentieth century.  It represented Reconstruction Finance Corporation and Federal National Mortgage Corporation, New Deal agencies.  In the early twenty-first century, Andrews Kurth had offices in London and Beijing, and employed more than 400 lawyers.

He held many posts in the Democratic Party of Texas, and unsuccessfully sought the 1914 nomination to be Governor of Texas on a prohibition platform, despite endorsements from President Woodrow Wilson and William Jennings Bryan.  His Houston law practice represented chiefly railroads and corporations, and he promoted Texas port facilities both in Congress and after.  He was general counsel for  the Port Commission of Houston.  He was a delegate at the 1892 Democratic National Convention, and in 1924 and 1928.

Because Ball had been instrumental in routing a railroad through Peck, Texas, the town was renamed Tomball, Texas, in his honor in 1907.

References

Further reading

Lewis L. Gould, Progressives and Prohibitionists: Texas Democrats in the Wilson Era (Austin: University of Texas Press, 1973; rpt., Austin: Texas State Historical Association, 1992)
George P. Huckaby, Oscar Branch Colquitt: A Political Biography (Ph.D. dissertation, University of Texas, 1946).
Frank W. Johnson, A History of Texas and Texans (5 vols., ed. E. C. Barker and E. W. Winkler [Chicago and New York: American Historical Society, 1914; rpt. 1916])
Vertical Files, Dolph Briscoe Center for American History, University of Texas at Austin (Tomball, Texas).
Clarence R. Wharton, ed., Texas under Many Flags (5 vols., Chicago: American Historical Society, 1930).

External links
 

1859 births
1944 deaths
University of Virginia School of Law alumni
Austin College alumni

Texas lawyers
Mayors of places in Texas
People from Huntsville, Texas
Democratic Party members of the United States House of Representatives from Texas